The 2018 Israeli Beach Soccer League was a national beach soccer league event that took place between 8 June and 27 July 2018, in Netanya, Israel.

Schedule of matches was published on the official Facebook page of Israeli Beach Soccer League.

Group stage
All kickoff times are of local time in Netanya, Israel (UTC+02:00).

Group A

Group B

Relegation playoffs (Loser on Final is relegated)

Relegation playoffs

Knockout stage

Quarter-finals

Semi-finals

Youth Final

Awards

Survival match

Exhibition match

Final

Goalscorers

12 goals

  Shalom Edri (Beitar "Italy Gold Jewellery" Jerusalem)
  Elihay Tzabari (Hapoel "Yahalomit Peretz/Taglit" Karmiel)
  Filip Filipov ("KELME" Be'er Sheva)

9 goals

  Ezequiel Carrera (Maccabi "RE/MAX" Netanya)
  Oleg Zborovskyi (Bnei "Falfala" Kfar Qassem)

8 goals

  Tzahi Ilos (Hapoel "A. Tahzokat Otobosim" Petah Tikva)
  Daniel Tsao (Hapoel "Millennium Terminal" Ashkelon)

7 goals

  Amer Yatim (Bnei "Falfala" Kfar Qassem)
  Itay Bar David (Beitar "Italy Gold Jewellery" Jerusalem)
  Lior Asmara ("Roah Bakfar" Tel Aviv)
  Fabio Costa (Ironi Rosh HaAyin)

6 goals

  Kobi Badash (Maccabi "RE/MAX" Netanya)
  Fran (Maccabi "RE/MAX" Netanya)
  Nir Cohen (Beitar "Italy Gold Jewellery" Jerusalem)
  Michael Kirtava (Hapoel "Sportball" Hedera)
  Nimrod Mechani (Hapoel "Sportball" Hedera)
  Joriel ("Auto Hai" Bnei Yehuda)

5 goals

  Domi (Maccabi "RE/MAX" Netanya)
  Deiwerson (Bnei "Falfala" Kfar Qassem)
  Wasim Agbaria (Bnei "Falfala" Kfar Qassem)
  Sagi Hayat (Beitar "Italy Gold Jewellery" Jerusalem)
  Reyder ("KELME" Be'er Sheva)
  Takasuke Goto ("KELME" Be'er Sheva)
  Eliran Magol ("Auto Hai" Bnei Yehuda)

Winners

Awards

See also
 Israeli Beach Soccer League

References

External links
 2018 Israeli Beach Soccer League's draw results
 Round 1's highlights
 Round 3's highlights
 10 Top Goals of 2018 Season

Israeli Beach Soccer League seasons
National beach soccer leagues
2018 in beach soccer